Pseudogynoxys is a genus of flowering plant in the groundsel tribe within the sunflower family, native to North and South America.

 Species 
 Pseudogynoxys benthamii Cabrera - Paraguay, Argentina, Bolivia
 Pseudogynoxys bogotensis (Spreng.) Cuatrec. - Colombia
 Pseudogynoxys chenopodioides (Kunth) Cabrera - from Tamaulipas to Nicaragua; introduced in Florida + Texas
 Pseudogynoxys chiribogensis K.Afzel. - Ecuador
 Pseudogynoxys cordifolia (Cass.) Cabrera - Peru
 Pseudogynoxys cummingii  (Benth.) H. Rob. & Cuatrec. - Mesoamerica
 Pseudogynoxys engleri (Hieron.) H. Rob. & Cuatrec. - Peru, Ecuador
 Pseudogynoxys filicalyculata (Cuatrec.) Cuatrec. - Peru, Ecuador
 Pseudogynoxys fragans (Hook.) H.Rob. & Cuatrec. - Guatemala
 Pseudogynoxys haenkei (DC.) Cabrera - Mesoamerica
 Pseudogynoxys lobata Pruski - Brazil, Bolivia
 Pseudogynoxys poeppigii (DC.) H.Rob. & Cuatrec. - Peru
 Pseudogynoxys pohlii (Baker) Leitão - Brazil
 Pseudogynoxys scabra (Benth.) Cuatrec. - Peru, Ecuador
 Pseudogynoxys sodiroi (Hieron.) Cuatrec. - Ecuador
 Pseudogynoxys sonchoides (Kunth) Cuatrec. - Peru, Ecuador

References

External links

 
Asteraceae genera
Taxonomy articles created by Polbot
Taxa named by Ángel Lulio Cabrera